The Wretched Stone is a children's picture book written and illustrated by the American author Chris Van Allsburg.

Plot summary
Told from the perspective of Captain Randall Ethan Hope, the crew of the Rita Anne finds a strange, glowing, cubic stone on an exotic island. After taking the strange object aboard their ship, the crew becomes obsessed with the stone, abandoning many of their former interests and leaving the captain wondering how to shake the crew out of their stupor. Gradually, the glowing stone turns the entire crew (except the captain) into grinning apes. Afterwards, the "Rita Anne' nearly sinks. On July 30th, they are rescued by another ship that drops them off at a harbor in "Santa Pengal". It is told in a 'journal' format, as it takes place over the course of May 8 to July 12 of an unspecified year.

References

External links
The Wretched Stone at chrisvanallsburg.com
The Wretched Stone by Chris Van Allsburg Google books

1991 children's books
American picture books
Novels by Chris Van Allsburg
Picture books by Chris Van Allsburg
Children's fiction books
Houghton Mifflin books